Elie Primary School is a school in Elie, Fife, Scotland. It is located partly in a Category C listed building dating from 1858. The architect of the relevant north block was Elie native John Currie.

See also
List of listed buildings in Elie and Earlsferry, Fife

References

External links

Category B listed buildings in Fife
Buildings and structures in Elie
Primary schools in Fife
1858 establishments in Scotland
Listed schools in Scotland
School buildings completed in 1858